The United States House of Representatives election in Utah for the 54th Congress was held on November 5, 1895, in anticipation of statehood, which was achieved on January 4, 1896.

Background
Utah Territory had been represented by a delegate since 1851. Utah Territory was originally significantly larger than the current state, including most of Nevada, and portions of Colorado and Wyoming, which borders it held when the first delegate was elected, and was reduced in size in several stages.  The territory had been colonized by Mormons who had sought to join the Union as the State of Deseret.

Due in large part to controversies over the beliefs of the Mormon majority, especially in regards to polygamy, the territory's admission as a state was delayed for a long time, and by the time of its admission, it was one of only four remaining territories in the contiguous United States.

Election results

See also
1895 United States House of Representatives elections

References

1895
Utah
United States House of Representatives